Trash is the eleventh solo studio album by American rock musician Alice Cooper. It was released on July 25, 1989, by Epic Records. The album features the single "Poison", Cooper's first top ten hit since his single "You and Me" in 1977 and marked a great success in Cooper's musical career, reaching the Top 20 of various album charts and selling more than two million copies. Trash features John McCurry (who has previously worked with Julian Lennon) on guitar, Hugh McDonald of Bon Jovi on bass as well as Bobby Chouinard and Alan St. Jon, both from Billy Squier's solo band on drums and keyboards, respectively. The album was the "biggest hit among his hair metal albums", peaking at number two in the UK and number 20 in the US.

Overview
After his return to the music industry with the successful "The Nightmare Returns" tour, Cooper had sought assistance from Desmond Child to create a comeback album. Trash became one of Cooper's biggest albums, accompanied by music videos for "Poison", "Bed of Nails", "House of Fire", and "Only My Heart Talkin'". A successful year-long worldwide concert tour in support of the album was documented in the home video release Alice Cooper Trashes The World.

The album features many guest performances including Jon Bon Jovi, Stiv Bators, and singer/guitarist Kane Roberts (who left Cooper's band in 1988), as well as 4 of the 5 members of Aerosmith, Cooper's 70s contemporaries who were also making a successful comeback at the time. Songwriting contributions were also made by Joan Jett, Diane Warren, Jon Bon Jovi, Richie Sambora, and John McCurry.

Critical reception
The album has received mostly positive reviews. AllMusic reviewer Alex Henderson gave the album four stars out of five describing it as a "highly slick and commercial yet edgy pop-metal effort that temporarily restored him to the charts in a big way".
Rolling Stone placed the album at 36 on their list of the "50 Greatest Hair Metal Albums of All Time". Kerrang! put the album in sixth place in on their ranking of every Alice Cooper album. MetalSucks included the album at No. 7 on their list of "The Ten Best Must-Have Glam Metal Albums".

Track listing

Personnel
Main musicians
Alice Cooper – vocals
John McCurry – guitar
Hugh McDonald – bass
Bobby Chouinard – drums
Alan St. John – keyboards

Additional personnel

Steven Tyler – vocals (track 5)
Jon Bon Jovi – vocals (track 8)
Kip Winger – vocals (track 10)
Joe Perry – guitar (track 3)
Richie Sambora – guitar (track 9)

Steve Lukather – guitar (track 9)
Kane Roberts – guitar (track 6)
Guy Mann-Dude – guitar (tracks 2, 4, 7)
Tom Hamilton – bass (track 8)
Joey Kramer – drums (track 8)

Mark Frazier – guitar (track 8)
Jack Johnson – guitar (track 8)
Paul Chiten – keyboards
Steve Deutsch – synth programming
Gregg Mangiafico – keyboards & special effects

Production
Produced by Desmond Child
Recorded by Sir Arthur Payson, Obie O'Brien and Nick DiDia (both at Sanctuary Studios), George Cowan (at Bearsville), Mark Tanzer (at Blue Jay), Lolly Grodner (at Mediasound), Ben Fowler (at Power Station), John Herman (at Right Track), Brian Peterofsky (at Sigma Sound).
Assistant Engineers: Duane Seykora (at The Complex) and Robert Hart (Village Recorders).
Mixed by Steve Thompson and Michael Barbiero.
Mastered by George Marino.

Charts and certifications 

|+Certifications for Trash by Alice Cooper

References

1989 albums
Albums produced by Desmond Child
Alice Cooper albums
Epic Records albums
Glam metal albums